Vovinam competition at the 2016 Asian Beach Games was held in Da Nang, Vietnam from 30 September to 2 October 2016 at Bien Dong Park.

Medalists

Men

Women

Mixed

Medal table

Results

Men

Five-gate form

1 October

Dual machete form
2 October

Dual form number 3
2 October

Attack by leg
30 September

Multi-weapon
30 September

Women

Dragon-tiger form

1 October

Dual sword form
2 October

Mixed

Female self-defense
1 October

Multi-weapon
30 September

References

External links 
Official website

2016 Asian Beach Games events